Hurricane Fabian was a powerful Cape Verde hurricane that impacted Bermuda in early September during the 2003 Atlantic hurricane season. It was the sixth named storm, fourth hurricane, and first major hurricane of the season, developed from a tropical wave in the tropical Atlantic Ocean on August 25. It moved west-northwestward under the influence of the subtropical ridge to its north, and steadily strengthened in an area of warm sea surface temperatures and light wind shear. After passing the island, the hurricane turned to the northeast, and became extratropical on September 8, before dissipating two days later.

Fabian was the strongest hurricane to hit Bermuda since Hurricane Arlene in 1963. It was both the most damaging and the first hurricane to cause a death on the island since 1926. The hurricane's powerful winds resulted in moderate damage and destroyed roofs throughout the island. A strong storm surge associated with the hurricane killed four people crossing a causeway on Bermuda, temporarily closing the only link between two islands. The endangered Bermuda petrel, better known as the cahow, was threatened by the hurricane, which destroyed ten nests, although volunteer work transported the species to a safer location. Strong swells resulted in damage in northern Puerto Rico and the Dominican Republic, and also caused four people to drown along the United States' Atlantic coast. In all, Fabian caused around US$300 million in damage and eight deaths.

Meteorological history

On August 25, a tropical wave emerged off the coast of Africa. Tracking westward, the wave developed convection over its center, and conducive conditions allowed it to develop further. The system passed through the Cape Verde islands later that day as convection steadily weakened. Moving westward into an area of warm waters and low vertical shear, the depression steadily intensified, and was named Tropical Storm Fabian on August 28 as convection increased and banding features became more prominent.

Banding features and outflow continued to develop as a ring of convection formed around the center of Fabian, and on August 30, the storm intensified into a hurricane while gradually slowing its motion to the west-northwest. As banding features and outflow became better defined, an eye developed in the center of the deepest convection. Fabian quickly strengthened and attained major hurricane status late that day. At this time, the deepest convection near the eye degraded in appearance, and Fabian temporarily stopped its strengthening trend. Later that day, the eye became distinct again within a perfectly round area of deep convection. Outflow continued to expand in all directions, and Fabian intensified into a Category 4 hurricane late on August 31. Thunderstorm activity near the eyewall became more intense, and the cloud tops in the eyewall became much cooler; simultaneously, outflow away from the eye became much more symmetrical, both signs of an intensifying tropical cyclone.

After maintaining its peak intensity for 12 hours Fabian degraded due to internal fluctuations, and began to weaken. The hurricane turned to the northwest on September 2 in response to a weakness in the subtropical ridge, a break caused by a mid-level circulation over the southwest Atlantic Ocean. After fading back to a Category 3 hurricane, Fabian re-intensified on September 4, and regained Category 4 status for a short time. The hurricane weakened again as it accelerated northward towards Bermuda, a motion due to an approaching mid-level trough. The eastern portion of the eyewall moved over the island, resulting in a direct hit; the center did not move over the island, so Fabian did not make landfall. After passing the island, the hurricane accelerated northeastward, and weakened to a  Category 2 hurricane on September 7. Steady weakening occurred as the hurricane moved into an area of increasing wind shear, drier air, and progressively cooler waters. Fabian's extratropical remnant turned to the north on September 9, and on September 10, Fabian's remnant merged with another extratropical storm while located between southern Greenland and Iceland.

Preparations
Not expected to be a direct threat, a meteorologist at the Bermuda Weather Service expected gusty winds and potentially heavy rainfall. Each successive advisory brought the hurricane steadily closer to Bermuda, and 35 hours before Fabian made its closest approach, the Bermuda Weather Service issued a hurricane watch for the island. When a track near Bermuda became more certain, a hurricane warning was issued for the island, approximately 29 hours before Fabian made a direct hit on the island.

The Bermuda Electric Light Company Limited recommended Bermuda residents to buy hurricane supplies such as candles, batteries, and non-perishable foods, to fill bathtubs and extra containers with water, and fill gasoline tanks for automobiles. In preparation, residents formed long lines at gas stations, banks, and supermarkets. All government offices and many businesses closed on the day prior to the hurricane hitting. All schools were closed, while all flights in and out of the island were canceled. Officials opened emergency shelters, and recommended 2,000 low-lying residents to evacuate; a hotel on the south shore of the island was evacuated as well. Several cruise ships expected to remain on the island departed early to avoid the hurricane. Local insurance companies on Bermuda experienced a great increase in business, as residents renewed lapsed policies or signed up for new policies for homes or businesses, though marine policies were stopped several days before the hurricane struck. The arrival of Fabian forced the cancellation or delay of several sports events, including a cricket match, a football game, and a dinghy race.

Impact

Fabian killed eight people and caused US$300 million in damages, primarily in Bermuda.

Caribbean
The hurricane produced storm surge damage in Antigua and Barbuda, where some boats were lightly damaged. Strong swells and high tides produced large waves on the north coast of Puerto Rico, washing out beaches in various locations. Waves knocked out a  portion of a construction site in Ocean Park, resulting in US in damage. Due to the waves and gusty winds, boats were advised to stay at port. Several families had to be evacuated in Nagua when rough seas flooded their homes.

Bermuda

The eye did not pass directly over the archipelago, instead passing to the west (placing Bermuda in the northeast quarter where the winds were particularly powerful) with the eyewall dragging over Bermuda for three hours. This prolonged the damaging winds the island was subjected to. Due to its fast motion, rainfall totals rose to only . There were also several unofficial reports of tornadoes. Strong rip currents from the hurricane persisted for several days prior to Fabian passing the island; two swimmers were caught in the currents and relied on lifeguard assistance to return to shore. As a result, rip tide warnings were posted for the island.

Strong waves caused extensive damage to the coastline, especially on the southern portion of Bermuda. The strong waves broke a boat from its moorings at Spanish Point. Not wanting to lose the ship, the owner, accompanied with two people, tried to save the vessel. One fell overboard before climbing aboard the boat. The three ventured the vessel through tornadoes and  waves, which dropped several feet of water in the ship; ultimately they safely arrived at Hamilton Harbour. Five charter boats capsized from the waves, while several others crashed against reefs. Strong waves collapsed a sea wall in Hamilton, causing traffic jams for one day until it was fixed.

The winds downed numerous power lines, causing 78% of the island's 32,031 power customers to experience power outages. The strong winds damaged or destroyed the roofs of numerous buildings on Bermuda. One of the areas lightest hit was around a hotel outside of Hamilton, which experienced no power outages or blown out windows, while one of the harder hit areas was Warwick. There, one resident noted, "Too many homes have lost roofs to count". One house was entirely destroyed on Rec View Hill, while an unconfirmed tornado destroyed much of the roof of a house in Devonshire. The hurricane destroyed a restaurant in Southampton and also damaged stands and roofs at sports facilities. Strong winds from the hurricane damaged several landmark buildings, including the House of Assembly and the City Hall, both in Hamilton, and the former military headquarters in St. George's.

Bermuda International Airport sustained US$15 million in damages, primarily to buildings and roadways which were washed away by the storm surge. The runway escaped major damage, however, and the airport re-opened the following day for emergency relief flights. Confronting the damages in the storm's aftermath, Airport General Manager James G. Howes was quoted by the news media as saying, "My heart sank when I first saw the Airport that morning. There was tons of debris everywhere and all the fire alarms and security alarms were going off. There was this din of bells and horns – it was like a war zone". The airport's ILS and radar were also damaged.

The hurricane also affected the Bermuda Weather Service, as  waves destroyed recording equipment. The winds severely damaged the island's major hotels, closing five for extended periods to repair damage. One hotel that remained open experienced damage to 25% of its rooms. The strong winds uprooted hundreds of trees along the island's golf courses, though little damage was reported at most courses. One course experienced significant damage at its club house, temporarily closing it.

Government Conservation Officer Dr. David B. Wingate reported the damage to the South Shore of Bermuda was the worst in a thousand years. The strong winds blew down hundreds of trees, caused severe damage to vegetation, and destroyed many of the island's indigenous plants. The hurricane washed away large sections of the nesting island for the endangered Bermuda petrel and destroyed 10 of the 70 active nests. The endangered birds were not on the island, though local residents quickly gathered to restore their habitat. Strong waves resulted in severe coastal erosion, and at one beach, the lack of sand destroyed a natural cove. The Natural Arches, a set of eroded stones resembling an arch that was popular in photographs, was destroyed by the waves. The powerful winds knocked coconuts off several trees and scattered them across the ground.

The storm surge from the hurricane stranded one vehicle with three police officers and another with a resident on the causeway between St. George's Parish and St. David's Island. After a fire truck failed in its attempt to rescue them, powerful waves washed the vehicles into Castle Harbour. The United States Coast Guard and Bermuda police divers mounted a full-scale search for the missing people during the worst of the storm. The strong winds and emotional issues of searching for colleagues made the search difficult. Ultimately, the vehicles and one dead body were recovered, with the others remaining missing, presumably dead. Another vehicle was on the causeway as the two cars became stranded, though the driver was able to safely cross. High winds and surf tore off the causeway's side walls and greatly damaged the structure, temporarily closing it to automobile traffic.

As most people were well-prepared, these were the only four deaths on the island. In addition, nine people sought medical attention for minor injuries. Damage on Bermuda totaled to US$300 million, reportedly the worst to affect the area since 1926.

Atlantic coast
Swells from the hurricane produced rip currents and heavy surf along the eastern North Carolina coastline. One man drowned near Cape Hatteras from the rip currents. Fabian produced moderate surfing conditions along the East Coast of the United States, primarily from Georgia to North Carolina.

Aftermath

Blocked roads initially caused delays to crews from the Bermuda Electric Light Company Limited (BELCO), which were attempting to restore power to the island. Of high priority among the places to be restored were the hospital, as well as hotels to accommodate tourists who remained on the island through the storm. By the second day after the storm passed the island, power was restored to 11,000 residents. Power on Bermuda was restored to all customers within three weeks of the hurricane, but the electricity supply distribution system was greatly weakened. This resulted in a rehabilitation plan implemented in October 2003. Days after the hurricane passed, moisture from Tropical Storm Henri resulted in thunderstorms and heavy rainfall; this hindered recovery efforts, but did not cause any reported damage. Lack of power caused interruptions to communications. While an emergency broadcast station was installed and tested prior the hurricane, the hurricane caused a problem to the system's back-up generator. The causeway in Bermuda remained closed for several days after the hurricane as road crews made temporary repairs. Upon being opened three days after the storm, traffic was limited to one lane of the original two. However, the causeway had to be closed in the event of rain, winds exceeding , and at night. The bridge was fully repaired by early November 2003.

In the days after the storm, people provided assistance for each other, especially for the elderly. Three days after the storm, for example, a radio station DJ announced a name for an elderly person in need, and within minutes someone would call to provide for their needs. Residents cleared smaller roads from debris with chainsaws, which in turn helped the power companies to make repairs quickly. As a result of damage on their homes, dozens of people stayed in five shelters or undamaged hotels. Residents purchased large quantities of gasoline in the days after Fabian, some of whom bought over US$500 worth. Officials assured there was no shortage, but requested drivers to conserve gas. XL Capital Ltd. shipped 250 tarpaulins, 10 electric generators, and rope supply to the island. The UK government offered help to the island with two Royal Navy ships with supplies such as tents, dried foods, and blankets. Premier Alex Scott declined the offer, believing the island could withstand on its own. World Vision also offered assistance with blankets, tents, and other supplies, while two United States companies offered to send generators. Bermuda Electric Light Company received aid from the Caribbean Electric Organization, which sent over 20 electricians to repair power lines.

Initially, the time for the destroyed vegetation on Bermuda to regrow was estimated to take decades. To help, the South Carolina Maritime Heritage Foundation, with support from a Boy Scout troop and nearby nurseries, delivered 1,000 boxwood plants to the island. Following the damage to the Bermuda petrel's habitat, Bermuda's Department of Conservation carried out a translocation program, which involved moving the habitat to Nonsuch Island. That island, a long-standing nature preserve, was much higher and safer for the birds, and by two years after the hurricane the population numbers were higher than before the storm.

Shortly after the hurricane, the American home improvement franchise This Old House, unaware of the limited extent of damage, decided to do a hurricane repair story. Upon realising that there would be little to nothing available for the Ask This Old House to repair, it was decided instead to do a renovation of an 1805 home in St. George's. It was only the second time that the franchise had worked outside of the United States.

A memorial to the four Bermudians whose lives were claimed by Hurricane Fabian was erected near the Causeway's east end by the airport, where the 10th anniversary of their deaths was remembered by government officials in September 2013. The onslaught of Hurricane Gonzalo in October 2014 prompted a catastrophe modeller to revisit Fabian's destruction, concluding that had it struck in 2014, it would have caused around US$650 million in damage.

Retirement

Due to the damage and deaths in Bermuda, the name Fabian was retired in the spring of 2004 and will never again be used for an Atlantic hurricane. The Bermuda Weather Service allowed residents to suggest a replacement name, with the only rule being the name had to be a male name beginning with the letter "F", able to be easily pronounced, and not currently in use by the National Hurricane Center. The service received a list of over 30 names, including Forrest and Frodo, after the character in The Lord of the Rings. The Bermuda Weather Service sent three names to the World Meteorological Organization: Fred, Ford, and Flynn. Out of the three mentioned, The World Meteorological Organization chose for Fabian to be replaced by Fred to be on the list for the 2009 season in the spring of 2004.

See also

List of Bermuda hurricanes
 List of retired Atlantic hurricane names
 List of Category 4 Atlantic hurricanes
 Hurricane Marilyn
 Hurricane Gonzalo
 Hurricane Nicole (2016)
 Hurricane Paulette
 Hurricane Teddy

References

External links

 NHC's archive on Hurricane Fabian
 
 Bermuda Weather Service

2003 Atlantic hurricane season
Category 4 Atlantic hurricanes
Cape Verde hurricanes
Retired Atlantic hurricanes
Hurricanes in Bermuda
2003 natural disasters
2003 meteorology
History of Bermuda
2003 in North America
2003 in the Caribbean
Fabian